The Bestune T99 is a mid-size crossover produced by the FAW Group under the brand name Bestune. It is positioned above the Bestune T77.

History
The FAW Group presented a first preview of the crossover at the Auto Shanghai in April 2019 with the T2 Concept. The 4.80 m long series model was presented in September 2019. The T99 has been on sale in China since 1 November 2019.

Infotainment
As a special feature, the manufacturer offers the vehicle with a holographic assistant. This assistant displays a holographic image on the dashboard. It supports the driver in essential functions of the vehicle - for example air conditioning control - and is addressed by voice control.

Technical specifications
The T99 is powered by a turbocharged two-liter petrol engine with 165 kW (224 hp). An 8-speed automatic transmission from Shengrui is used. A 6-speed automatic transmission from Aisin Seiki has also been available since June 2020.

2023 facelift
In December 2022, the Bestune T99 received a facelift or the 2023 model year alongside the T77 facelift. The front end has been completely redesigned with the rear end slightly restyled.
For the interior, three LCD displays including a dual 12.3-inch LCD screen for dashboard and central control display plus a 7-inch LCD touch-screen air-conditioning control panel. The controls on the steering wheel are upgraded to touch-type, and the facelift model is also equipped with a handle-type electronic gearshift. 

In terms of power, the updated Bestune T99 is equipped with a 2.0-litre turbocharged engine with a maximum power of 165 kilowatts and a maximum torque of 340 Nm. The engine is mated to a 6-speed automatic or 8-speed automatic gearbox.

References

External links
Official website

T99
Cars introduced in 2019
Front-wheel-drive vehicles
Mid-size sport utility vehicles
Crossover sport utility vehicles